William K. Renz (May 24, 1913 – May 1981) was an American male handball player. He was a member of the United States men's national handball team. He was part of the  team at the 1936 Summer Olympics, playing 3 matches, and was a playing-coach. On club level he played for Cake Bakers Sport Club in the United States.

References

1913 births
1981 deaths
American male handball players
Olympic handball players of the United States
Field handball players at the 1936 Summer Olympics
Sportspeople from Philadelphia
20th-century American people